Gjerdrum is a municipality in Akershus in Viken county, Norway.  It is part of the traditional region of Romerike.

Gjerdrum borders the municipalities of Nannestad, Nittedal, and Ullensaker, and Lillestrøm. The administrative centre of the municipality is the village of Ask.

Name and coat of arms
The municipality (originally the parish) is named after the old Gjerdrum farm (Norse Gerðarvin). The first element is the genitive of a river name Gerð and the last element is vin 'meadow, pasture'. The river name is derived from the Norse word garðr meaning 'fence' and so the meaning is 'the river whose function is a fence (and/or as a border)'.

The coat of arms is from modern times. They were granted in 1993. The arms show a traditional Norwegian form of roundpole fence. The arms are also canting because the name of the municipality refers to a fence.

History
Gjerdrum was established as a municipality on 1 January 1838 (see formannskapsdistrikt).

Store norske leksikon says that artefacts indicate that humans have lived in Gjerdrum since ancient times; furthermore the names of places also indicate the same.

2020 landslide

On 30 December 2020 a quick clay landslide occurred in the village of Ask within Gjerdum municipality. 10 people died. The slide measured , injured 10 people (including one seriously), left 10 unaccounted for and led to 1,000 being evacuated from the village, with several homes having been destroyed in the slide.

Geography

Gjerdrum lies on the southwestern part of the Romerike Plain (Romerikssletta); this eastern part of the municipality lies at a low altitude and is covered by significant layers of clay that was deposited, towards the end of the previous ice age.

The quick-clay at Gjerdrum was deposited (in a fjord) around 8,000 or 9,000 years ago, when the sea level was around 200 meters higher.

Demographics

In 2021, 1258 inhabitants were immigrants or Norwegian-born to immigrant parents. 264 inhabitants had Polish parents and/or were Polish (themselves); 173 had Lithuanian parents and/or were Lithuanian.

Sports
The local sports team is Gjerdrum IL.

People from Gjerdrum 

 Christian Krohg (1777–1828) politician, cabinet member, MP
 Olaf Devik (1886 in Gjerdrum – 1987) meteorologist and physicist 
 Daniel Franck  (born 1974) a snowboarder, silver medallist in the men's halfpipe in the 1998 Winter Olympics
 Petter Fagerhaug (born 1997 in Gjerdrum) cross-country mountain biker
 Kristoffer Skjerping (born 1993) a former road racing cyclist, lives in Gjerdrum

Gallery

References

External links

Municipal fact sheet from Statistics Norway

GIL football 

 
Municipalities of Akershus
Municipalities of Viken (county)